Saint-Sauveur-de-Landemont (literally Saint-Sauveur of Landemont) is a former commune in the Maine-et-Loire department in western France. On 15 December 2015, it was merged into the new commune Orée-d'Anjou. Its population was 994 in 2019.

See also
Communes of the Maine-et-Loire department

References

Saintsauveurdelandemont